Tol-e Khandaq-e Sofla (also Romanized as Tol-e Khandaq-e Soflá; also known as Tol-e Jandaq and Tol-e Khandaq) is a village in Bakesh-e Yek Rural District, in the Central District of Mamasani County, Fars Province, Iran. At the 2006 census, its population was 47, in 9 families.

References 

Populated places in Mamasani County